In Greek mythology, Acratopotes, the drinker of unmixed wine, was a hero worshiped in Munychia in Attica. According to Pausanias, who calls him simply Acratus, he was one of the divine companions of Dionysus, who was worshiped at Attica. Pausanias saw his image at Athens in the house of Polytion, where it was fixed in the wall.

Notes

References 

 Pausanias, Description of Greece with an English Translation by W.H.S. Jones, Litt.D., and H.A. Ormerod, M.A., in 4 Volumes. Cambridge, MA, Harvard University Press; London, William Heinemann Ltd. 1918. Online version at the Perseus Digital Library
 Pausanias, Graeciae Descriptio. 3 vols. Leipzig, Teubner. 1903.  Greek text available at the Perseus Digital Library.

Companions of Dionysus
Religion in ancient Athens
Deities of wine and beer